Mangalore International Airport , is an international airport serving the coastal city of Mangalore, India. It is one of the only two international airports in Karnataka, the other being Kempegowda International Airport, Bangalore. Mangalore International Airport is the second busiest airport in Karnataka. In addition to domestic destinations, flights depart daily for major cities in the Middle East. The airport was named Bajpe Aerodrome, when it opened on 25 December 1951 by former Prime Minister Jawaharlal Nehru arrived then on a Douglas DC-3 aircraft.

Overview
It is on top of a hill, with two tabletop runways (09/27 and 06/24). Only two other airports in India have tabletop runways – Kozhikode and Lengpui. The very small and basic terminal was renovated in the early 2000s, adding parking controls, additional seating and additional cafés. The airport was initially used for limited domestic flights, mainly to Mumbai and Bangalore.

The operation of international flights started in 2006 with Air India Express flying to Dubai. Mangalore Airport was a customs airport for six years, from 3 October 2006 to 3 October 2012, before it was granted the status of International Airport.

Until 2005, the small  runway meant the airport could only handle Boeing 737-400 size aircraft. The longer runway now handles slightly larger aircraft. On 10 January 2006, an Airbus A319 of Kingfisher Airlines landed on the new runway. On 28 September 2012, an Airbus A310 landed for the first time at Mangalore. It was a charter flight for the Hajj pilgrims to Mecca, Saudi Arabia.

From 2011 to 2012, the airport had a revenue of  42.64 crores and an operating profit of  87.6 million, up from  8.3 million in 2006–07. In 2012–13 the airport handled a landmark 1.02 million passengers with 11,940 aircraft movements. The revenue for the same period was Rs 506.6 million, and it recorded an operating profit of Rs 164.9 million during 2012–13. In 2013–14 it handled a 1.25 million passengers with revenues of Rs 638.9 million.

In July 2019, the central government approved leasing of the airport through public-private partnership (PPP) to the Adani Enterprises, for operations, management and development for the next 50 years. This airport is accredited by the Airports Council International (ACI) under the Airport Health Accreditation (AHA) programme.

Facilities

Runway
It is a tabletop runway, with landing approaches presented with the extreme edges of a hillside. Landing on this short runway was considered difficult.

Mangalore Airport was the first airport in Karnataka to have two runways and the first to have a runway made of concrete. A Jet Airways flight from Bangalore with 95 passengers on board was the first to land on this runway. The airport has acquired land to build a taxiway parallel to the new runway to reduce aircraft turnaround time.

Union Minister of State for Civil Aviation Praful Patel announced on 15 May 2010 that a work order for extending the runway to  would be issued soon. After the crash of Air India Express Flight 812, the minister reaffirmed on 30 May 2010 that the runway extension will take place and will take into account the spillover area required during an emergency.

Safety improvements were implemented after the directorate General of Civil Aviation (DGCA) identified this as one of the 11 airports in India as unsafe. Addition of a runway end safety area, ensuring proper markings on the runway, and proper maintenance of the basic strip were among the improvements.

Passenger terminal
The airport had a trial run of the terminal for domestic flights on 16 December 2009. On 15 May 2010, the terminal building was inaugurated by Civil Aviation Minister, Praful Patel, along with former Chief Minister of Karnataka, B. S. Yediyurappa. It was to be opened to air traffic on 1 July 2010, but it became operational on 2 August 2010 due to delays caused by the Air India Express Flight 812 accident.

This fee was approved by the Civil Aviation Ministry.

, 26 domestic flights and 52 international flights were operated every week.

Air traffic control
The construction of a new air traffic control (ATC) tower was completed in June 2014, and commissioned for one-month trial on 19 January 2015.

On 5 September 2013 the Airports Authority of India commissioned a DGCA approved advanced automated air traffic management system, replacing the older system. The system enhances flight safety by providing flight plans, direction finders, and air-ground-data link messages. This system processes radar feeds from Bangalore, Chennai, and Thiruvananthapuram and displays them at Mangalore.

Old terminal

Since 2011 the old terminal has been used for direct flights to Medina, Saudi Arabia, for pilgrims undertaking the Hajj. In 2011 and 2012 chartered flights landed at Mangalore International Airport and carried passengers from the old terminal building.

Indian Coast Guard Air Station
The Mangalore Airport Director announced on 28 January 2016 that the Airports Authority of India have handed over 17,000 sqft of space at the old terminal building to the Indian Coast Guard to set up an air station for its air operations. The ICG proposed the stationing of two of its Dornier 228 aircraft at the air station.

Expansion
* Currently the apron is connected to the edge of runway 06, and aircraft movements on the apron have to be stopped when a plane lands and can only resume when it reaches the apron. A new 2,400-metre taxiway will be built parallel to the runway and join the runway ahead of the landing threshold, enabling aircraft on the apron to move towards the runway and hold, saving 10 to 15 minutes. The construction work on the parallel taxiway started on 1 November 2014 and though slated for completion in September 2016, only Phase I was completed by March 2017.
 The 812 crash inquiry recommendation for runway lengthening not having been implemented due to funding obstacles, its length remains .
 Passenger volume projections for the year 2025 made by the AAI while constructing the new passenger terminal were already exceeded in 2012.

Airlines and destinations

Statistics 
Presently, it ranks 12 in the list of airports with international passenger traffic after Delhi, Mumbai, Chennai, Kochi, Bangalore, Hyderabad, Kolkata, Thiruvananthapuram, Ahmedabad, Kozhikode, Tiruchirappalli international airports. The airport had 8.91 lakh passengers in the FY 2011-12 and witnessed a growth rate of 5.44%. According to the airport sources, it has a target of achieving 16 lac passengers traffic in the FY 2016–17.

Air cargo complex 
Air cargo complex of the airport was commissioned in the year 2013.

Major commodities are fresh vegetables, chilled fish, ornamental fish, cashews, flowers and machinery parts.

Connectivity
KSRTC (Karnataka State Road Transport Corporation) operates Airport low-floor Volvo bus services from Mangalore Central Railway Station and Manipal to Mangalore International Airport. Taxis ply between the airport and the city of Mangalore. Prepaid taxi service is available around the clock at the airport counter in the arrival hall.

Accidents and incidents

 On 19 August 1981, Indian Airlines Flight 557, a HAL 748 VT-DXF overshot the  old runway 27 at Mangalore-Bajpe Airport in wet weather. The aircraft came to a halt just beyond the runway edge. While there were no fatalities, the aircraft was damaged beyond repair and was written off. One of the passengers was Veerappa Moily, then Finance Minister of Karnataka. An investigation revealed numerous pilot-attributed errors: the aircraft's flaps had not been set to landing position, the aircraft had landed long on the downsloping runway, at excessive speed and with a tailwind.  The aircraft involved was HAL 748 VT-DXF, with manufacturer's serial number 511; it first flew in 1967.
 On 22 May 2010, Air India Express Flight 812, a Boeing 737-800 VT-AXV, flying on the Dubai-Mangalore route, overshot the  runway number 06/24, killing 158 people, including 6 crew members; only 8 survived. The aircraft overshot the runway and plunged into a steep gorge at the end of the runway. The starboard wing impacted the concrete socket of the instrument landing system (ILS) localiser antenna,  rendering it unusable. This resulted in delayed or cancelled flights for two weeks during the monsoon rains, which reduced visibility. It took the airport a little under a month to repair and calibrate the ILS and bring it back online.

See also
 List of airports in Karnataka

References

External links

 Mangalore Airport at Airports Authority of India website.
 

Airports in Karnataka
Transport in Mangalore
International airports in India
Airports established in 1951
Buildings and structures in Mangalore
1951 establishments in India
Economy of Mangalore
20th-century architecture in India